Caryocolum trauniella is a moth of the family Gelechiidae. It is found in Austria, Italy and Slovenia.

The length of the forewings is about 6 mm for males and 6–7 mm for females. The forewings are blackish, with a white basal spot. The hindwings are mid-brown. Adults have been recorded on wing from late June to mid-July.

References

Moths described in 1868
trauniella
Moths of Europe